Tuberoinfundibular peptide of 39 residues is a protein that in humans is encoded by the PTH2 gene.

TIP39 is related to parathyroid hormone (PTH; MIM 168450) and PTH-related protein (PTHRP; MIM 168470) and is a ligand for PTH receptor-2 (PTHR2; MIM 601469) (John et al., 2002).[supplied by OMIM]

The molecular interaction of TIP39 with the PTH2 receptor has been characterized in full 3D molecular detail, identifying among other residues, Tyr-318 in transmembrane helix 5 as a key residue for high affinity binding 

Expression of TIP39 has been linked to social interaction in both zebrafish  and rats. In these species, mutations of TIP39 or its receptor lead to abnormal social behavior.

References

Further reading